Maria Teresa Peszek (born September 9, 1973) is a Polish singer, songwriter and actress. She embarked on a professional acting career in the early 1990s and went on to appear in over 40 stage plays, as well as a number of feature films and television series. In 2005, Peszek released her debut album, the commercially successful and critically acclaimed Miasto mania, followed by Maria Awaria (2008) and Jezus Maria Peszek (2012) which both topped the Polish albums chart and received favourable reviews. Peszek is noted for controversial lyrics and subjects of her work, often revolving around sexuality, politics, social norms and religion.

Biography
Peszek was born in Wrocław, Poland into a family of actors. Having appeared as a child in several theatre and TV productions in the 1980s, she officially debuted in a theatrical adaptation of Sanatorium Under the Sign of the Hourglass in 1995 at the Juliusz Słowacki Theatre in Kraków, where she graduated from an acting school the following year.

Her debut album, Miasto mania, was released in October 2005 by Kayax, an independent label co-founded by Polish singer Kayah. The material on the album drew inspiration from Poland's capital, Warsaw, and served as a musical background to a multi-media theatre play of the same title which premiered simultaneously. It spawned the popular lead single "Moje miasto" and was a critical and commercial success, eventually reaching platinum certification for selling in over 30,000 copies. In 2006, Peszek won the Fryderyk award for the Best New Act and released an extended play Mania siku which consisted of live recordings and new songs.

September 2008 saw the release of her next album, entitled Maria Awaria, promoted by the songs "Ciało" and "Rosół". The album explicitly dealt with the concept of human sexuality and caused many controversies, especially in the conservative right wing media. Nonetheless, it gathered numerous flattering reviews and became her first number 1 album in the Polish albums chart. It was certified platinum in less than a month and won the Paszport Polityki award in 2009. Peszek embarked on a long tour to support the album, which continued with breaks into late 2010. In, 2011, she contributed a theme song to a controversial Polish film Z miłości.

Peszek's third studio album, Jezus Maria Peszek, was released in October 2012 through Mystic Production, preceded by the single "Ludzie psy". Prior to recording the album, Peszek had suffered from nervous breakdown which was widely discussed across Polish media and reflected in the album's lyrics. The album was a criticism towards organized religion, patriotism and social norms which caused further controversies. It was another major success, gathering highly flattering reviews, debuting atop Polish albums chart and eventually receiving platinum certification. Peszek toured internationally to promote the album, performing concerts in Poland, England, Ireland and Czech Republic, which resulted in the live release JEZUS is aLIVE (2014).

Her fourth album, Karabin, was released in February 2016 by Warner Music Poland and explored such topics as freedom, hate speech and individualism. It spawned the popular lead single "Polska A B C i D" and the controversial "Modern Holocaust". Although it did not match the critical success of its predecessors, it went gold in Poland in just over a month. To promote the album, Peszek again toured in Poland, Ireland, England and Czech Republic. In October 2017, Peszek released the single "Ophelia" recorded for her brother's stage adaptation of Hamlet.

Peszek began working on new material during the COVID-19 pandemic. In June 2021, she released "Virunga", a song dedicated to the Polish LGBT community, which she performed live at the 2021 Warsaw Equality Parade. Her fifth studio album, titled Ave Maria, was released in September 2021 and aparat from advocating the rights of women and sexual minorities, it criticised Poland's conservative politics and child sexual abuse in the Catholic Church. The album debuted atop the Polish album sales chart. In 2022, she toured in Poland in support of the album, starred in a popular Polish Netflix series Królowa, and released the autobiographical book Naku*wiam zen in collaboration with her father, Jan Peszek.

Personal life
She has been in a relationship with her partner, Edward, since 1992. She is an atheist. Peszek has expressed support for Polish politician Robert Biedroń.

Discography

Studio albums

Live albums

Singles

Filmography

Feature films
 1993: Schindler's List
 1995: Spis cudzołożnic
 1997: Nocne graffiti
 2001: The Hexer
 2002: Julie Walking Home
 2004: Ubu Król
 2008: 0 1 0
 2018: Nina

TV series
 1984: Rozalka Olaboga – as Aldzia Kłos
 2000: Na dobre i na złe – as Anna Radwańska
 2000–2001: Miasteczko – as Mariola Zbyś
 2002: Wiedźmin – as Iola
 2003: Magiczne drzewo – as Jacek's mother
 2005: Boża podszewka II – as Stasia
 2022: Queen - as Wiola

Books
 2008: Maria Awaria. Bezwstydnik
 2022: Naku*wiam zen

References

External links

Maria Peszek on YouTube
Maria Peszek on Discogs

1973 births
Living people
Musicians from Wrocław
Mystic Production artists
Polish actresses
Polish lyricists
Polish songwriters
Polish voice actresses
Polish atheists
Polish LGBT rights activists
21st-century Polish singers
21st-century Polish women singers